is an anime series made by Toei Animation in 1981. It was aired in Japan by TV Asahi.

In the original title when it was first made in Japan, an "E" was added to the title; "Sandybelle".

Similarly to Silver Fang, the show is relatively unknown in the U.S. but was quite popular in Asia, Latin America, Arab countries and Europe, particularly Scandinavia. It first aired in France in La Cinq in the late 1980s, starting on 15 April 1988.
Sandybell is about 15-18 years old.

Plot 
Hello! Sandybell is the story of a girl who lives in Scotland with her father. She spends her time playing with her faithful dog (Oliver) and her friends.  One day she meets the Countess of Wellington, a kind-hearted woman living in the castle near their village.  She also meets Kitty, an arrogant young lady who lives in the large mansion outside their village.

Kitty hates Sandybell and constantly visits the Countess in the hope of winning the love and interest of her son, Marc, who falls in love with Sandybell. The Countess gives Sandybell a white lily and she plants it outside the village. She also brings other flowers and plants them around the lily, making a small garden of flowers around it. Sandybell treasures the lily because it reminds her of her deceased mother.

Sandybell's goal throughout the series is to find her mother someday. In the final episodes, they finally reunite. However, upon their meeting Sandybell finds that her mother suffers from amnesia, and Sandybell fails to convince her that she was her daughter. Later, when a young child falls into the water and Sandy saves his life,  flashbacks strike her mother and she remembers the past.

Staff 
 Series director: Hiroshi Shitara
 Episode Director: Kazumi Fukushima
Original story: Shiroh Jinbo
Script:Hiroshisa Soda, Makoto Sakurai, Noboru Shiroyama
Music: Takeo Watanabe
Character Design: Makoto Sakurai
Background Art: Eiji Itô
Planning: Yasuo Yamaguchi
Production manager: Akira Sasaki
Theme Song Arrangement: Joe Hisaishi
Theme Song Lyrics: Noriko Miura
Theme sung by Mitsuko Horie
Production: TV Asahi, Asatsu Shinsha, Toei

References

External links 

Hello! Sandybell at Toei Animation 

1981 anime television series debuts
1982 Japanese television series endings
Adventure anime and manga
Drama anime and manga
Slice of life anime and manga
Television shows set in Scotland
Television shows set in London
Television shows set in Paris
Television shows set in Greece
Toei Animation television
TV Asahi original programming
1980s children's television series